The Heaven Upside Down Tour is the fifteenth concert tour by American rock band Marilyn Manson. It was launched in support of their tenth studio album, Heaven Upside Down, which was released on October 6, 2017. Beginning on July 20, 2017, the tour currently includes seven legs spanning Europe and North America, for a total of 124 shows.

The live band for the tour initially included Marilyn Manson on vocals, Twiggy on bass guitar, Tyler Bates on lead guitar, Paul Wiley on rhythm guitar, Gil Sharone on drums and Daniel Fox on percussion and keyboards. Several of these musicians have left the band over the course of the tour, however. Fox played his final show with the band on the July 31 date in Moscow, although he remains a member of crew as Sharone's drum technician. Twiggy was dismissed from the band on October 25. Bates also indicated he would not be performing on the second European leg, saying: "I want to play as many shows as I can, but I've got some pretty intense commitments with film coming up and that takes precedence. The great thing about my working relationship with Manson and how the band is set up is that they can accommodate me when I'm there, or reconfigure things when I'm not."

Their second co-headlining tour with Rob Zombie, the "Twins of Evil: The Second Coming Tour" (following the 2012 "Twins of Evil Tour") began on July 11 in Detroit, and consists of nearly 30-dates spanning North America.

Itinerary
The band debuted several songs during the first European leg of the tour, including new tracks from Heaven Upside Down, such as "Revelation #12", "We Know Where You Fucking Live" and "Say10", and "1°", although the latter was subsequently revealed to be band jam based on their cover version of Eurythmics' "Sweet Dreams (Are Made of This)". The tour also encompassed several appearances by the band at music festivals, including an October 22 appearance at the Sacramento-based Aftershock Festival, at which Nine Inch Nails was also scheduled to appear. Manson indicated that he may join that band on-stage at the festival, after he and Trent Reznor mended a longstanding feud. However, Marilyn Manson later pulled out of the festival due to injuries caused by a prop falling on the vocalist.

Injuries
The entire band narrowly avoided injury in Moscow when their tour bus was involved in a collision with a semi-trailer truck. Bates recalled: "We had a real asshole driver who worked for the promoter, and he nearly got us killed on the way from the airport. At some point, we just bailed out of the vehicle, because [the driver] was being really weird and contentious, and tried to lock us inside." Additionally, the North American leg of the tour has seen the band's eponymous vocalist be injured several times whilst performing on-stage. During the encore performance of "The Beautiful People"  on September 29 at Stage AE in Pittsburgh, Manson broke his ankle after jumping from the stage to sing with fans who were standing near the barricade. After the vocalist crawled back on-stage, the band abruptly abandoned the song. However, they resumed when Manson invited opener Alice Glass to take over on vocals. He had reportedly expressed safety concerns to his tour manager prior to the concert.

The following night, at the Hammerstein Ballroom in New York City, a large 750kg – approximately 1650lbs – stage prop consisting of two oversized pistols attached to one another via metal scaffolding fell on the vocalist. According to Manson, the metal truss supporting the prop had not been securely fastened to the ground. He later explained: "I wasn't trying to climb it. It started to fall and I tried to push [it] back, [but] I didn't get out the way in time. I'm not sure what I hit my head on, but it did fall onto my leg". The incident happened while the band were performing their cover of "Sweet Dreams". Manson lay unconscious on the stage for up to 15 minutes, before being carried out of the venue on a stretcher to a nearby hospital. The prop broke Manson's fibula in two places, and required a plate and ten screws to be inserted into the bone to repair the damage. He also had a screw inserted into his ankle to repair the damage sustained during the Pittsburgh show. He was discharged from hospital after several days, and spent time recuperating at his home in Los Angeles.

The following nine dates of the North American leg were immediately cancelled, with the remaining October shows gradually cancelled over the next week. All of these shows – excluding festival appearances – were rescheduled for the beginning of 2018.

Setlist
Marilyn Manson played a lot of songs during the tour. Most played songs are: "Disposable Teens", "The Beautiful People", "The Dope Show", "Sweet Dreams (Are Made of This)", "This Is the New Shit", "Mobscene", "Say10" and "Deep Six".

Shows 

Notes

Cancelled or rescheduled shows

Personnel 
 Marilyn Manson – vocals
 Tyler Bates – lead guitar
 Twiggy – bass (Dismissed from the band on October 25)
 Paul Wiley – rhythm guitar
Johnny Depp (Guest) – rhythm guitar (Briefly played at the London show)
 Gil Sharone – drums
 Juan Alderete – bass (Played first show on November 5)
 Daniel Fox – keyboards and percussion (From the beginning of the tour, until July 31)

Opening acts

References

Marilyn Manson (band) concert tours
2017 concert tours
2018 concert tours